Rockland County is the southernmost county on the west side of the Hudson River in the U.S. state of New York. It is part of the New York metropolitan area. The county's population, as of the 2020 United States Census, is 338,329, making it the state's third-most densely populated county outside New York City (after Nassau and neighboring Westchester Counties, respectively). The county seat and largest city is New City. Rockland County is accessible via the New York State Thruway, which crosses the Hudson to Westchester at the Tappan Zee Bridge ten exits up from the NYC border, as well as the Palisades Parkway five exits up from the George Washington Bridge. The county's name derives from "rocky land", as the area has been aptly described, largely due to the Hudson River Palisades.

Rockland County is the smallest county by area in New York outside New York City. It comprises five towns and nineteen incorporated villages, with numerous unincorporated villages (sixteen) and hamlets. Rockland County is designated as a Preserve America Community, and nearly a third of the county's area is parkland. The county has the largest Jewish population percentage of any U.S. county, at 31.4%, or 90,000 residents. Rockland also ranked 31st on the list of highest-income counties by median household income in the United States, with a median household income of $82,534 according to the 2010 census.

History

The area that became Rockland County was originally inhabited by Algonquian-speaking Native Americans, including Munsees, or Lenni Lenape.  The Tappan tribe had a particularly noteworthy presence in the area, extending from present-day Nyack, south to Sparkill and Tappan, down the Hackensack River valley through present-day Bergen County, NJ, and also along the Palisades and Hudson shore all the way down to present-day Edgewater, NJ.

In 1609, Henry Hudson was the first major Dutch explorer to arrive in the area.  Hudson, thinking he had found the legendary "Northwest Passage", sailed on the Half Moon up the river that would one day bear his name, and sailing through the area that is now Haverstraw before exploring north towards what is now Albany.
 
In the years before 1664 when the area was formally a Dutch colony called New Netherland, present-day Rockland did not have formal European settlements.  However, individuals did explore the area and made transactions with Tappan tribe for land with the idea that it could have future use.  For example, in 1640, Dutch Captain David Pietersz. de Vries purchased from natives the area where the Sparkill Creek flows into the Hudson River.

In 1664, the British Crown assumed control of New Netherland from the Dutch.  In June 1664, the Berkeley-Carteret land grant established the colony of New Jersey, dividing present-day Rockland and Bergen Counties into separate political areas.  The northern border of New Jersey was placed in a straight line from the Delaware River at present-day Port Jervis to the Hudson River at 41 degrees even North latitude, where the Palisades Cliffs pause and give way to Sneden's Landing in Orangetown.  The state line remains there to this day, though various disagreements along the exact border were had over the years.

In the 1670s, permanent Dutch settlers began to arrive with land grants, starting with the Tappan area. These settlers were eager to escape "city life", moving from Manhattan to Rockland.   A number of unique, Dutch-style red sandstone houses still stand, and many place names in the county reveal their Dutch origin.

In 1683, when the Duke of York (who became King James II of England) established the first 12 counties of New York, present-day Rockland County was part of Orange County, known then as "Orange County South of the Mountains". Orangetown was created at the same time under a royal grant, originally encompassing all of modern Rockland County. Around this time, as the English began to colonize Nyack and Tappan, the Native Americans began to leave Rockland in search of undisturbed land further north.

The natural barrier of the Ramapo Mountains and the size of the county made carrying out governmental activities difficult. At one point, two governments were active, one on each side of the Ramapo Mountains, so Rockland split off from Orange in 1798 to form its own county. That same year, the county seat was transferred from Tappan to New City, where a new courthouse was built.

Haverstraw was separated from Orangetown in 1719, and became a town in 1788; it included the present-day Clarkstown, Ramapo, and Stony Point. Clarkstown and Ramapo became towns in 1791, followed by Stony Point in 1865.

During the American Revolution, when control of the Hudson River was viewed by the British as strategic to dominating the American territories, Rockland had skirmishes at Haverstraw, Nyack, and Piermont, and significant military engagements at the Battle of Stony Point, where General "Mad" Anthony Wayne earned his nickname. George Washington had headquarters for a time at John Suffern's tavern, the later site of the village of Suffern. British Major John André met with American traitor Benedict Arnold near Stony Point to buy the plans for the fortifications at West Point. André was captured with the plans in Tarrytown on his way back to the British lines; he was brought to Tappan for trial in the Tappan church, found guilty, hanged, and buried nearby. Still another important chapter in the story of the Revolution was written on May 5, 1783, when General Washington received Sir Guy Carleton at the DeWint House, where they discussed terms of a peace treaty. Two days later, Washington visited Sir Guy aboard a British war vessel H.M.S Perseverance. On this day, the king's navy fired its first salute to the flag of the United States of America.

In the decades following the Revolution, Rockland became popular for its stone and bricks. Many buildings in New York City were built with bricks made in Rockland.  These products, however, required quarrying in land that many later believed should be set aside as a preserve. Many unsuccessful efforts were made to turn much of the Hudson Highlands on the northern tip of the county into a forest preserve. Union Pacific Railroad president E. H. Harriman, though, donated land and large sums of money for the purchase of properties in the area of Bear Mountain. Bear Mountain/Harriman State Park became a reality in 1910 when Harriman's widow donated his lands to the state, and by 1914, more than an estimated one million people a year were coming to the park. After World War I, Rockland County became the most important sausage-making hub in New York.

In 1911, Letchworth Village, an institution for the mentally disabled opened in Rockland County near Thiells. The institution gained national infamy in 1972, when an investigation by Geraldo Rivera revealed the patients there to having been housed in neglectful conditions. Letchworth closed in 1996.

Rockland remained semirural until the 1950s, when the Palisades Interstate Parkway, Tappan Zee Bridge, and other major arteries were built. In the decades that followed, the county became a maturely developed suburb of New York City.  As people moved up from the five boroughs (particularly the Bronx in the early years) the population flourished from 89,276 in 1950 to 338,329 in 2020.

Geography

Rockland County lies just north of the New Jersey-New York border, west of Westchester County (across the Hudson River), and south of Orange County. Its east border is formed by the Tappan Zee portion of the Hudson River. The county's terrain ranges from 1,283' (391m) ASL on Rockhouse Mountain (northwest of Lake Welch) to approaching sea level along the Hudson River. According to the US Census Bureau, the county has a total area of 199.34 sq mi (516 km2), of which 173.55 sq mi (449.49 km2) are land and 25.79 sqmi (66.80 km2) (13%) are covered by water. It is the state's smallest county outside the five boroughs of New York City.

About 30% of Rockland County is devoted to parkland, belonging to either the five towns, incorporated villages, the state, or the county. These parks provide walking and hiking trails, ballfields, dog runs, historic sites, ponds, streams, salt marshes, and equestrian trails. Some popular state parks include Bear Mountain State Park on the northernmost tip of the county, Harriman State Park, also along the county's northern boundary, and Nyack Beach State Park along the Hudson River, with trails connecting to Rockland Lake State Park. The county hosts numerous public and private golf courses, with the towns of Orangetown, Ramapo, Stony Point, and Haverstraw all operating public golf courses within their towns. The Palisades Interstate Park Commission operates two golf courses in Rockland Lake State Park. Notable private courses in the county include Paramount Country Club, Manhattan Woods Golf Course (designed by PGA great Gary Player), and Rockland Country Club (Sparkill).

Adjacent counties

 Orange County - northwest
 Putnam County - northeast
 Westchester County - east
 Passaic County, New Jersey - west
 Bergen County, New Jersey - south

Lakes

 Breakneck Pond
 Congers Lake
 Cranberry Pond
 Lake DeForest
 Lake Sebago
 Lake Tappan (part)
 Lake Wanoksink
 Pine Meadow Lake
 Potake Lake (part)
 Rockland Lake
 Second Reservoir
 Lake Welch
 Tappan Zee (along east border)
 Third Reservoir

 Antrim Lake

Climate

Demographics

2020 census
As of the 2020 United States Census, 338,329 people and 100,438 households were residing in the county. The population density was 1,950/sq mi (753/km2). The 107,002 housing units averaged 617/sq mi (238/km2).

Of the 107,002 households, 38% had children under the age of 18 living with them, 63% were married couples living together, 10% had a female householder with no husband present, and 23% were not families. Around 19% of households were made up of individuals, and 8% had someone living alone who was 65 or older. The average household size was 3.0 and the average family size was 3.5.

The county's age distribution was 28.4% under 18, 8% from 18 to 24, 28% from 25 to 44, 24.30% from 45 to 64, and 12% who were 65 or older. The median age was 36 years. For every 100 women, there were 95 men. For every 100 women age 18 and over, there were 91 men.

The median income for a household was $93,024 and for a family was $80,000. Males had a median income of $58,000 versus $39,000 for females. The per capita income for the county was $39,286. The mean, or average, income for a family in Rockland County is $73,500 according to the 2004 census. About 6% of families and 12.5% of the population were below the poverty line, including 14% of those under age 18 and 8% of those age 65 or over.

2000 census
As of the 2000 United States Census, 286,753 people, 92,675 households, and 70,989 families were residing in the county. The population density was 1,652/sq mi (638/km2). The 94,973 housing units averaged 547/sq mi (211/km2). Residents live closer together than the census numbers indicate, as 30% of the county is reserved as parkland. About 9% of residents reported speaking Spanish at home, 5% Yiddish, 3% French-based creole, 1.5% Italian, 1.3% Tagalog, 1.3% Hebrew, 1.2% French, and 1% Russian. Other languages spoken at home by at least 1000 people include Malayalam, Korean, Chinese, German, and Polish.

Orthodox Jewish community
As of 2017, the Orthodox Jewish community is 15 percent of the population in Rockland County.

Education

The county is home to several Blue Ribbon School of Excellence Award winners, awarded by the U.S. Department of Education:

 In 2000–2001, Liberty Elementary School in Valley Cottage (semi-finalists in 2004)
 In 2007, Strawtown Elementary School in West Nyack
 In 2008 & 2014, Franklin Avenue Elementary School in Pearl River
 In 2009, George W. Miller Elementary School in Nanuet
 In 2011, Pearl River Middle School in Pearl River
 In 2013, Cherry Lane Elementary School in Suffern
 In 2016, Nanuet Senior High School In Nanuet
 In 2018, Clarkstown High School South

School districts
School districts include:

 Clarkstown Central School District
 East Ramapo Central School District
 Nanuet Union Free School District
 North Rockland Central School District (Haverstraw-Stony Point)
 Nyack Public Schools
 Pearl River Union Free School District
 South Orangetown Central School District
 Suffern Central School District (formerly the Ramapo Central School District)

High schools

Colleges and universities
The county is home to several colleges and universities. - State University of New York (SUNY): - Rockland Community College - Suffern, NY
 Private university:

 Beth Medrash Elyon
 Dominican College (Dominican College of Blauvelt) - Orangeburg
 Long Island University extension site at Rockland Community College - Suffern
 Columbia University's Lamont–Doherty Earth Observatory
 Nyack College - Nyack
 Rabbinical College Beth Shraga - Monsey, NY
 St. Thomas Aquinas College - Sparkill, NY
 Yeshiva D'Monsey Rabbinical College - Monsey
 Yeshivath Viznitz - Kaser (Monsey)

Transportation
 
The Tappan Zee Bridge connects South Nyack in Rockland County and Tarrytown in Westchester County across the Hudson River in the Lower Hudson Valley of New York. The old bridge was replaced with a new span in 2017.

Major highways

The county is served by several major highways, including Interstate 87/287 (the New York Thruway), opening from Suffern to Yonkers in 1955. The old Tappan Zee Bridge opened the same year, connecting Rockland and Westchester, allowing Rockland County's population to grow rapidly. The Palisades Interstate Parkway, a project of master planner Robert Moses, and built between 1947 and 1958, connects the county directly to the George Washington Bridge due south. The Garden State Parkway opened in 1955, connecting New Jersey to I-87/287.

 
 
 
 
 
 
 
 
 
  -  Originated as the Nyack Turnpike
Korean War Veterans Memorial Highway
 
 
 
"Rockland County Clerk Paul Piperato Memorial Highway"
 
 

For further information

 List of county routes in Rockland County, New York
 List of county routes in Rockland County, New York (1–38)
 List of county routes in Rockland County, New York (41–75)
 List of county routes in Rockland County, New York (76–118A)

Bus

The Transport of Rockland operates several local bus routes throughout the county, and the express bus Hudson Link routes to city centers and train stations in Tarrytown and White Plains in Westchester County. TOR provides connections to other neighborhood bus operations –  Minitrans and connections to private commuter lines, Rockland Coaches and Short Line providing service to northern New Jersey and New York City.

Railroad
NJ Transit/Metro-North Railroad operates the Port Jervis Line, which stops at the Suffern Railroad Station and Sloatsburg Station, and the Pascack Valley Line, whose stops include Pearl River, Nanuet, and Spring Valley. in their respective hamlets and village of the same name. Connections on this line are available at Secaucus for service to Penn Station in Midtown Manhattan and service to the Meadowlands Sports Complex in East Rutherford, New Jersey. The southern terminus of both lines is Hoboken Terminal in New Jersey, where connections can be made to several NJ Transit bus lines, ferries, and PATH trains to New York City.

Until 1958, Rockland County's eastern side was served by the New York Central Railroad's passenger service on the West Shore Railroad from Weehawken, New Jersey, opposite midtown Manhattan up through Tappan, West Nyack, Congers, and Haverstraw, on to the West Hudson shore cities of Newburgh, Kingston, and Albany. The service ran to West Haverstraw, in the north of the until 1959. The Erie Railroad ran train service on the Northern Branch through the southeastern corner of the county to Nyack up to 1966.

Ferry
NY Waterway operates a ferry service between Haverstraw and Ossining in Westchester County for the Metropolitan Transportation Authority. Commuters take the Transport of Rockland's Ferry Express route to the Haverstraw ferry terminal for service to Metro-North's Hudson Line service to Grand Central Terminal. Ferry service is typically suspended in the colder months when the Hudson River freezes over, and commuters must take shuttle buses across the Tappan Zee Bridge.

Airports
Nearby airports include:
 New York: John F. Kennedy International Airport, LaGuardia Airport, Westchester County Airport, and Stewart International Airport
 New Jersey: Newark Liberty International Airport, Teterboro Airport

Law, government, and politics
All of Rockland County falls within the 17th Congressional District, along with central and western Westchester County. The district is represented by Congressman Mike Lawler.

The county of Rockland is represented as follows in the New York State Senate as of 2023:

The county of Rockland is represented as follows in the New York State Assembly as of 2023:

Rockland County government is led by a county executive. Republican Ed Day was first elected in 2013 and re-elected in 2017 & 2021. The previous county executive was Republican C. Scott Vanderhoef, who was re-elected in 2009 to his fifth four-year term. Day is the third county executive in Rockland history, with Vanderhoef having defeated the incumbent, John T. Grant (D), in 1993. Prior to 1985, Rockland County did not have a county executive. 

Rockland County has a county legislature made up of 17 members, elected from single-member districts. The Chairman of the Legislature is Democrat Jay Hood Jr. In the November 2019 election Republicans gained one seat, reducing the Democratic majority from 10–7 to 9–8. As of January 2020, the legislators are:

Town governments
The five towns of Rockland County are led by town supervisors and town boards. The villages encompassed in the towns are led by mayors and village trustees.
As of the November 2021 elections, the town supervisors are:

County courts

There are three types of general trial courts in Rockland County: the New York Supreme Court, the County Court, and the Justice Courts. The Supreme Court is the trial level court of the New York State Unified Court System, which presents some confusion as the Supreme Court is the highest court of appeals in the federal system, as well as in most states (the Court of Appeals is the highest court in New York). The Supreme Court has broad authority over all categories of cases, both civil and criminal. Generally, the Supreme Court in Rockland County hears civil cases involving claims in excess of $25,000. While the Supreme Court has jurisdiction over criminal cases in most counties, this is handled by the County Courts. In Rockland, however, the Supreme Court does exercise jurisdiction over some criminal cases.

The County Court is inferior to the Supreme Court and is authorized to hear criminal cases that have occurred in the county as well as limited jurisdiction over civil cases. The County Court handles felony cases exclusively and shares jurisdiction with the town and village justice courts on misdemeanor cases and other minor offenses and violations. The County Court's jurisdiction on civil cases is limited to those involving less than $25,000.

Each of the towns and 15 of the villages have Justice Courts, which mostly hear routine traffic ticket cases, especially from the New York State Thruway and the Palisades Interstate Parkway. They also handle drunk driving charges, lower-level criminal misdemeanor matters, and occasionally perform arraignment on felonies (most felony proceedings are heard in County Court). These courts generally handle the highest volume of cases.

National politics
Like most of the Hudson Valley, Rockland County historically voted Republican but in recent years narrowly voted Democratic. Between 1892 and 1992, Rockland County only voted Democratic three times–Lyndon B. Johnson's landslide victory of 1964, Franklin Delano Roosevelt's landslide victory in 1936 (in which it was the only New York City suburb to vote Democratic), and Woodrow Wilson's first campaign in 1912. Rockland shifted Democratic in 1992, and has since voted Republican once, in 2004 for George W. Bush. Despite this shift, national elections have remained close in Rockland County as compared to neighboring Westchester County, which has witnessed dependable double-digit Democratic victories since the 1990s.

Rockland County hasn't voted for a popular vote loser since 1976, tied for the longest streak in the country with St. Joseph County, Indiana, and Caddo Parish, Louisiana. In 2016 and 2000, it voted for Hillary Clinton and Al Gore, respectively, both of whom lost the electoral college but won the popular vote. The longest bellwether county for electoral college victors is Clallam County, Washington.

|}

Sports

 The New York Boulders (formerly the Rockland Boulders), a member of the Frontier League, was founded in 2011 by former Yankee catcher John Flaherty of Pearl River, Clarkstown resident Michael Aglialoro (president of Clarkstown Education Foundation) and Stephen Mulvey (former part-owner of the Brooklyn-Los Angeles Dodgers). The team, owned by Bottom 9 Baseball, play their home games at the 6,362-seat, 16-suite Clover Stadium.
 Rockland Country Club is located in Sparkill, New York and features an 18-hole golf course.
 The New York Raiders, an American semi-professional rugby league football team based in Congers, New York, currently play in the American National Rugby League (AMNRL) competition. Their home games are at Rockland Lake State Park; they partner with the Canberra Raiders of Australia's National Rugby League (NRL).
The Nyack Rocklands played minor league baseball in the North Atlantic League from 1946 to 1948. The Rocklands were an affiliate of the Philadelphia Athletics.

Media

 The Journal News
 Our Town
 WRKL AM 910
  WRCR AM 1700
 Left of the Hudson
 Rockland World Radio
 Nyack News and Views
 Rockland County Times
 Rockland Review
 The Hook
 Rockland County's Best Magazine
 Clipper
 The 2017 CW series, Riverdale - Rockland County mentioned in pilot as site.

Health
According to Scorecard.org, which integrates data from different sources including the United States Environmental Protection Agency (EPA), in 2002, Rockland County ranked among the worst 10% in the United States in terms of air releases. Recent EPA statistics show that a total of 66 presently active Rockland County facilities are currently regulated. In Scorecard's list of Top 10 polluters from 2002, the Lovett generating station in Tompkins Cove is the top polluter, releasing 1,523,339 pounds of toxic emissions. Studies were released in 2000 and in 2004 by the Clean Air Task Force to study the impacts of power plant emissions in the United States. This data for Rockland County shows that a total of $2,150,800 was paid in compensation for numerous illnesses caused by power plant pollution, including asthma attacks, heart attacks and death. The Lovett generating station was closed and dismantled prior to 2014. From 2015 to 2018, the Haverstraw Quarry owned and managed by CRH Tilcon and Oldcastle Materials was heavily fined for air and water pollution, including over-blasting, over-excavating, non-viable use of its NESCO unhealthy dust suppression systems and lethal dust & water runoffs into protected waterways. In the period from 2017 to 2020, Suez experienced instances of discolored water and odor complaints. During 2020, the Rockland County Health Dept. and New York State Department of Environmental Conservation (NYSDEC) Conservationfound/investigated and informed Suez of untreated polluted water at Tilcon operated discharge points at a stream that flows into Lake DeForest. After discovery, Tilcon stopped pumping the waste. Higher cancer rates in Rockland County as compared to Manhattan associate towards drinking water quality, aging drink water infrastructure/storm drain runoff concerns.

Recently, COVID-19 pandemic was first confirmed to have reached Rockland County on March 6, 2020. After the areas of Spring Valley and Monsey were identified as having the highest infection rates, County Executive Ed Day requested that state emergency management declare those areas a closed containment zone. As of July 4, 2021, there are a total of 47,027 COVID-19 cases and 966 deaths. At 14,450 cases per 100,000, Rockland had the greatest density of COVID-19 cases of any New York county. 47% of the population and 58% of the eligible population (aged 12 and over) have been vaccinated. The Orthodox Jewish community, the largest in the country, have some of the lowest vaccination rates in the state; Monsey's is the lowest in the state, at 17.8%, as of June 15, 2021.

News reports confirmed that the first known case of polio in the United States in a decade was discovered in Rockland County in July 2022.

Solar field
In 2014, Clarkstown created a first-of-its-kind in New York State 2.3-megawatt solar system consisting of about 4,300 panels on top of a closed, highly regulated, flat shadeless 13-acre section of the former garbage landfill in West Nyack. The unit is sized to generate 3 million kilowatt-hours annually – enough power to supply about 200 homes, that provides one-third of the electric needs of the Town of Clarkstown government. The Clarkstown solar field project is at the maximum size that is currently allowed by New York State. The installation was projected to save taxpayers as much as $4 million over 30 years by reducing the amount of the town's annual electric bill – which is about $2 million and produce 10 percent of all the electricity that O&R gets through solar power. The project was installed in summer 2014, coming online in October.

Municipalities

Paul W. Adler, the chairperson of the Rockland County's Jewish Community Relations Council, said in a 1997 New York Times article that "There are two reasons villages get formed in Rockland. One is to keep the Hasidim out and the other is to keep the Hasidim in."

Administrative divisions of New York
There are five towns in Rockland County. The most populous is Ramapo at 148,919, while the least populous is Stony Point, at 14,655, according to the 2020 US Census.
There are eighteen incorporated villages in Rockland County after the April, 2022, dissolution of the Village of South Nyack, twelve of which are located at least partially in the town of Ramapo, and none of which are in Stony Point. There are seventeen Census-designated places and seven Hamlets within the five towns of Rockland County.

Towns

 Clarkstown (pop. 86,855)
 Haverstraw (pop. 39,087)
 Orangetown (pop. 48,655)
 Ramapo (pop. 148,919)
 Stony Point (pop. 14,655)

Clarkstown is divided into 4 wards for the purposes of municipal representation

Villages

 Airmont
 Chestnut Ridge
 Grand View-on-Hudson
 Haverstraw
 Hillburn
 Kaser
 Montebello
 New Hempstead
 New Square
 Nyack
 Piermont
 Pomona
 Sloatsburg
 Spring Valley
 Suffern
 Upper Nyack
 Wesley Hills
 West Haverstraw

Census-designated places

 Bardonia
 Blauvelt
 Congers
 Hillcrest
 Monsey
 Mount Ivy
 Nanuet
 New City (county seat)
 Orangeburg
 Pearl River
 South Nyack
 Sparkill
 Stony Point
 Tappan
 Thiells
 Valley Cottage
 Viola
 West Nyack

Hamlets

 Central Nyack
 Garnerville
 Jones Point
 Palisades
 Rockland Lake
 Sparkill Previously known as Tappan Sloat
 Tallman
 Tomkins Cove

Defunct communities

 Doodletown
 Grassy Point
 Johnsontown
 Ladentown
 Middletown
 Nauraushaun
 St John's in the Wilderness
 Tappan Sloat
 Sandyfield
 Sickletown
 Sterlington

Points of interest

Educational and cultural
 Major John Andre Monument - Tappan, New York. Represents British army officer John André, put to death for assisting Benedict Arnold in his attempted surrender in West Point during the American Revolutionary War.
 Camp Shanks - Orangetown, New York. A museum in a former military camp, named for Major General David Carey Shanks (1861–1940).
 Edward Hopper Birthplace and Boyhood Home- Nyack, New York. The home of American realism painter Edward Hopper, now an art center.
 Mount Moor African-American Cemetery - Established in 1849 and contains approximately 90 known graves and is located at Palisades Center, West Nyack.
 The Old 76 House- Tappan, New York. One of the oldest bars in America, a meeting place for Patriots during the Revolutionary War, headquarters of Nathaniel Greene.
 Washington Avenue Soldier's Monument and Triangle - Suffern, New York. Honors George Washington and Rochambeau, where they encamped during the American Revolutionary War.

Commercial and entertainment
 Blue Hill Plaza - Pearl River, New York. 21-story office tower and an eight-story office building on 90-acres of landscaped and wooded property.
 Clover Stadium - Ramapo, New York. A baseball stadium home to the New York Boulders and the St. Thomas Aquinas College baseball team.
 Lafayette Theatre - A movie palace in downtown Suffern, New York.
 Palisades Center - West Nyack, New York. Opened in 1998, one of America's largest shopping malls.
 Rockland Bakery - Nanuet, New York. Opened in 1986, Rockland's biggest bakery, delivering bread and other baked products as far as Connecticut, New Jersey and Pennsylvania.
 The Shops at Nanuet - Nanuet, New York. Opened in 1969 as Nanuet Mall. It was the site of the notorious 1981 Brinks Robbery.

Parks

 Bear Mountain State Park - Stony Point, New York
 Blauvelt State Park - Blauvelt, New York
 Harriman State Park (bordered between Rockland and Orange County, New York)
 High Tor State Park - Clarkstown, New York
 Hook Mountain State Park - Clarkstown, New York
 Nyack Beach State Park - Upper Nyack, New York
 Rockland Lake State Park - Congers, New York
 Tallman Mountain State Park - Orangetown, New York

See also

 Downstate New York
 Hudson Valley
 List of counties in New York
 List of New York State Historic Markers in Rockland County, New York
 National Register of Historic Places listings in Rockland County, New York
 Ramapough Mountain Indians
 Rumachenanck tribe
 Brink's robbery (1981)
 Gilchrest Road, New York crossing accident

References

Further reading

External links

 
 The Historical Society of Rockland County
 Historical Markers and War Memorials in Rockland County, New York
 Journal-News Rockland
 Rockland Review weekly newspaper

 
1798 establishments in New York (state)
Counties in the New York metropolitan area
Jewish communities in the United States
Populated places established in 1798